AB SEB Bankas is a commercial bank in Lithuania. It is the Lithuanian subsidiary of one of the largest Swedish banks, the SEB Group.

History 

It was registered as a public company in the Enterprise Register of the Republic of Lithuania on 29 November 1990 as Spaudos bankas, which was soon renamed as AB Vilniaus bankas. Vilnaus bankas introduced the first Visa credit card to Lithuania in 1993 and launched the first ATM machines in Lithuania in 1995. Vilnaus bankas signed a strategic cooperation agreement with SEB Group of Sweden in 1998 and fully rebranded itself after said Swedish parent company in 2008.

Structure 

SEB Bank’s corporate group in Lithuania includes SEB Bank as well as its subsidiary company SEB Investicijų Valdymas, a fully owned subsidiary engaged in provision of investment management services,

Other SEB-owned entities operating in Lithuania are:
 SEB Gyvybės Draudimas, a life insurance company,
 Litectus, a real estate management company
 Skandinaviska Enskilda Banken AB, Vilnius Branch, a shared service center of the SEB Group established on 6 October 2008 in Vilnius, providing back office services (operations, IT, HR and finance) to SEB units worldwide.

The largest shareholder of SEB Bank is Skandinaviska Enskilda Banken, owning 100 percent of the bank’s shares.

See also 

Skandinaviska Enskilda Banken
SEB Pank (Estonia)
SEB banka (Latvia)

External links 
AB SEB bankas

Banks of Lithuania
Banks established in 1990
Companies based in Vilnius
Lithuanian companies established in 1990